Calcein, also known as fluorexon, fluorescein complex, is a fluorescent dye with excitation and emission wavelengths of 495/515 nm, respectively, and has the appearance of orange crystals.  Calcein self-quenches at concentrations above 70mM and is commonly used as an indicator of lipid vesicle leakage. It is also used traditionally as a complexometric indicator for titration of calcium ions with EDTA, and for fluorometric determination of calcium.

Applications

The non-fluorescent acetomethoxy derivate of calcein (calcein AM, AM = acetoxymethyl) is used in biology as it can be transported through the cellular membrane into live cells, which makes it useful for testing of cell viability and for short-term labeling of cells. Alternatively, Fura-2 , Furaptra , Indo-1 and aequorin may be used. An acetomethoxy group obscures the part of the molecule that chelates Ca2+, Mg2+, Zn2+ and other ions. After transport into the cells, intracellular esterases remove the acetomethoxy group, the molecule gets trapped inside and gives out strong green fluorescence. As dead cells lack active esterases, only live cells are labeled and counted by flow cytometry.

Calcein is now rarely used as a Ca2+ or Mg2+ indicator because its fluorescence is directly sensitive to these ions only at strongly alkaline pH, and thus it is not particularly useful for measuring Ca2+ or Mg2+ in cells. Fluorescence of calcein is quenched strongly by Co2+, Ni2+ and Cu2+ and appreciably by Fe3+ and Mn2+ at physiological pH. This fluorescence quenching response can be exploited for detecting the opening of the mitochondrial permeability transition pore (mPTP) and for measuring cell volume changes. Calcein is commonly used for cell tracing and in studies of endocytosis, cell migration, and gap junctions.

The acetoxymethyl ester of calcein is also used to detect drug interactions with multidrug resistance proteins (ABC transporters ATP-binding cassette transporter genes) in intact cells as it is an excellent substrate of the multidrug resistance transporter 1 (MDR1) P-glycoprotein and the Multidrug Resistance-Associated Protein (MRP1). The calcein AM assay can be used as a model for drug-drug interactions, for screening transporter substrates and/or inhibitors; and also to determine in vitro drug resistance of cells, including samples from patients.

Calcein is also used for marking freshly hatched fish and for labeling of bones in live animals.

References

Cell culture reagents
Lactones
Amines
Fluorone dyes
Complexometric indicators
Acetic acids
Spiro compounds